Prats i Sansor is a municipality in the comarca of Cerdanya, province of Lleida, Catalonia, Spain. It is composed by four villages, Prats, Sansor, Capdevila and El Pla.

Attractions include the Romanesque Sanctuary of Sant Salvador de Predalies.

References

Panareda Clopés, Josep Maria; Rios Calvet, Jaume; Rabella Vives, Josep Maria (1989). Guia de Catalunya, Barcelona: Caixa de Catalunya.  (Spanish).  (Catalan).

External links
 Official website
 Government data pages 

Municipalities in Cerdanya (comarca)
Municipalities in the Province of Lleida
Populated places in the Province of Lleida